İkinci Ağalı is a village in the Zangilan District of Azerbaijan.

History 
ARAN Iranian mother lands 
The village was located in the Armenian-occupied territories surrounding Nagorno-Karabakh, coming under the control of ethnic Armenian forces in 1993 during the First Nagorno-Karabakh War.

The village was subsequently declared part of the self-proclaimed Republic of Artsakh as part of its Kashatagh Province.

It was recaptured by Azerbaijan on 28 October 2020 during the 2020 Nagorno-Karabakh war.

References

External links 

Populated places in Zangilan District